Club Social y Deportivo Alianza, usually known as Alianza de Cutral Có, is an Argentine football club based in the city of Cutral Có in Neuquén Province. The team currently plays in the Torneo Argentino B, the regionalised 4th level of Argentine football league system.

External links
Official website
Argentino C club profile

Football clubs in Neuquén Province
Association football clubs established in 1979
1979 establishments in Argentina